Pierre Émile Bouchard (born February 20, 1948) is a Canadian former professional ice hockey player who played in the National Hockey League (NHL) with the Montreal Canadiens and Washington Capitals. He was selected by the Canadiens in the first round (fifth overall) of the 1965 NHL Amateur Draft.

Bouchard played an important role, along with Bill Nyrop, as steady defensive-defensemen to the Canadien’s offensive “superstar” trio of Robinson, Savard and Lapointe who dominated the NHL blueline in the 1970s.

Bouchard's NHL career began after the Montreal Canadiens had missed the playoffs in the 1969–70 season, unacceptable for a franchise which had not missed post-season play in 22 years, and among the changes that were made were to bring Bouchard along with Guy Lapointe up from the minors. In his rookie year in 1970–71, Bouchard was part of the Canadiens' team that upset the powerful, record-breaking Boston Bruins in the first round and went on to win the Stanley Cup. Bouchard played for five Stanley Cup-winning Canadiens teams in eight seasons.

Prior to the 1978–79 season, a failed manipulation of the waiver system by the Canadiens led Bouchard's rights to unintentionally move from Montreal to Washington. Montreal had intended to reclaim him, but NHL President John Ziegler interfered in the deal. Initially unhappy with the move, Bouchard played only one game in the 1978–79 season and considered retirement. However, he returned next season to the NHL with Washington where he finished his career playing four seasons.

His father was Canadiens' Hall of Fame defenceman of the 1940s and 1950s Émile "Butch" Bouchard. From 1970 to 1975 Pierre was on the same team as Henri Richard, creating the unusual occurrence of a player having been teammates with both father and son in the NHL. Richard had played with Butch Bouchard in the 1955–56 season.

After retirement Bouchard went into business and broadcasting. He became one of the most popular NHL francophone analysts.

Career statistics

References

External links

Profile at hockeydraftcentral.com

1948 births
Living people
Canadian ice hockey defencemen
Cleveland Barons (1937–1973) players
French Quebecers
Hershey Bears players
Ice hockey people from Quebec
Montreal Canadiens announcers
Montreal Canadiens draft picks
Montreal Canadiens players
Montreal Junior Canadiens players
Montreal Voyageurs players
National Hockey League broadcasters
National Hockey League first-round draft picks
Sportspeople from Longueuil
Quebec Nordiques announcers
Stanley Cup champions
Washington Capitals players